Letseng Airport  is an airstrip serving the Letseng diamond mine in Mokhotlong District, Lesotho. The runway is at very high elevation, 10,084.8 feet.

See also

Transport in Lesotho
List of airports in Lesotho

References

External links
 Letseng
 HERE Maps - Letseng
 OpenStreetMap - Letseng
 OurAirports - Letseng

Airports in Lesotho